The Portugal national under-16 football team is the association football team that represents the nation of Portugal at the under-16 level.

Competitive record

FIFA U-16 World Championship 
Portugal have qualified for one FIFA U-16 World Championship with their performance being a third place finish in the 1989 FIFA U-16 World Championship.

UEFA European U-16 Championship

Honours 
 UEFA U-16 Championship
Champions (4): 1989, 1995, 1996, 2000
Runners-up (1): 1988

 Montaigu Tournament
Champions (4): 2010, 2012, 2017, 2018
Runners-up (2): 1993, 1994

European national under-16 association football teams
F